A random encounter is a method governing encounters with enemies in many RPG video games.

Random Encounter may also refer to:

 Random Encounter (film), a 1998 Crime thriller film
 Random Encounter (band), an independent American video game inspired rock group that features an accordion
 Serious Sam: The Random Encounter, a 2011 video game
 Random Encounters, a  2011 web series